Kindernothilfe (KNH) is a charity organization and was founded in 1959 by a group of Christians in Duisburg, Germany, in order to help needy children in India. Over time, it has become one of the largest Christian organizations in Europe for children's aid.

Today it supports almost 2 million children and young people in 31 countries in Africa, Asia, Latin America and Eastern Europe. KNH aims to give needy children in the poorest countries of the world a chance to a good start in life. That means a basic school education and vocational training, good nutrition and health care, as well as community-oriented support to the families of the children.

KNH works together with partner organizations located abroad, usually churches, congregations or Christian organizations. However, the support of children is always granted irrespective of religion.

The head office is in Duisburg. Here, staff members and volunteers coordinate the work abroad and carry out administrative, educational and lobby work as well as launch publicity campaigns.

Finances

Donors 

KNH is a registered charitable organization and a member of the Diaconic Services of the Evangelical Church in Germany. More than 90 percent of the work is financed through donations from 245.000 people who support Kindernothilfe. KNH heeds its Christian values and responsibilities as reflected in the life of Jesus.

Child sponsorships 

Child sponsorships is Kindernothilfe's most important aid form which can accompany children until they become responsible for themselves.

Grants and subsidies 

As well as this, it receives subsidies from the German Federal Ministry for Economic Co-operation and Development (BMZ) and from the European Union as well as church grants: It also benefits from the payment of fines.

Seal of approval 

Every year since 1992 Kindernothilfe has received the DZI seal of approval. This is awarded by the German Central Institute for Social Affairs (DZI) to charity organisations that uses the money received in a reliable, transparent and responsible manner.

Foundation 

Kindernothilfe started the Kindernothilfe Foundation in 1999. The chairman of the foundation committee is Dr. Norbert Blüm, a former cabinet minister. The yields from the foundation capital of approx. 6.3 million Euro flow directly into Kindernothilfe projects.

Kindernothilfe works on national and international levels by joining alliances, co-operating with networks and other organisations to achieve a global improvement of economic, social and political structural conditions. It participates in campaigns or initiates its own campaigns.

Kindernothilfe is above all committed to the implementation of the UN Convention on the Right of the Child which forms an important base for its work. At the beginning of 2004 Kindernothilfe was granted consultative status with the economic council and social council (ECOSOC) and this now enables it to draw more attention to the needs of children.

One of the founders of Kindernothilfe was Lüder Lüers.

Alliances and campaigns 

Kindernothilfe is a member of these alliances and campaigns:
 Verband Entwicklungspolitik deutscher Nichtregierungsorganisationen (VENRO)/Association for Development Policy of German Non-Government Organizations
 Ecpat
 Forum Kinderarbeit/German Anti Child-Labour Forum
 erlassjahr.de
 Deutscher Initiativkreis für das Verbot von Landminen
 TransFair
 International Coalition to stop the Use of Child Soldiers
 German National Coalition for the implementation of the UN-Convention on the Rights of the Child
 Action against AIDS Germany
 Werkstatt Ökonomie (Workshop Economy)
 Forum Menschenrechte (Forum Human Rights)
 Global campaign for Education

References

External links 
 

Children's charities based in Germany
Foreign charities operating in India
Christian charities
Development charities based in Germany
Organizations established in 1959
Non-profit organisations based in North Rhine-Westphalia
Duisburg
1959 establishments in West Germany